Athis is a genus of moths within the family Castniidae. It was described by Jacob Hübner in 1819.

Species
 Athis ahala (Druce, 1896)
 Athis amalthaea (Druce, 1890)
 Athis axaqua González & Fernández Yépez, 1992
 Athis bogota (Strand, 1912)
 Athis clitarcha (Westwood, 1877)
 Athis delecta (Schaus, 1911)
 Athis flavimaculata (Miller, 1972)
 Athis fuscorubra (Houlbert, 1917)
 Athis hechtiae (Dyar, 1910)
 Athis inca (Walker, 1854)
 Athis palatinus (Cramer, [1777])
 Athis pinchoni (Pierre, 2003)
 Athis pirrelloi Vinciguerra, 2011
 Athis rutila (R. Felder, 1874)
 Athis superba (Strand, 1912)
 Athis therapon (Kollar, 1839)
 Athis thysanete (Dyar, 1912)

References

Castniidae